Le Chesne may refer to the following communes in France:

Le Chesne, Ardennes, in the Ardennes département
Le Chesne, Eure, in the Eure département